Topology is a branch of mathematics concerned with geometric properties preserved under continuous deformation (stretching without tearing or gluing).

Topology may also refer to:

Math

Topology, the collection of open sets used to define a topological space
Discrete topology
Trivial topology
Lawvere–Tierney topology of a topos
Grothendieck topology of a category

Electronics

Topology (electronics), a configuration of electronic components

Computing

Network topology, configurations of computer networks
Logical topology, the arrangement of devices on a computer network and how they communicate with one another
TopologiLinux, a Linux distribution

Geospatial data

Geospatial topology, the study or science of places with applications in earth science, geography, human geography, and geomorphology
In geographic information systems and their data structures, topology and planar enforcement are the storing of a border line between two neighboring areas (and the border point between two connecting lines) only once. Thus, any rounding errors might move the border, but will not lead to gaps or overlaps between the areas.
Also in cartography, a topological map is a greatly simplified map that preserves the mathematical topology while sacrificing scale and shape
Topology is often confused with the geographic meaning of topography (originally the study of places). The confusion may be a factor in topographies having become confused with terrain or relief, such that they are essentially synonymous.

Biology

The specific orientation of transmembrane proteins
In phylogenetics, the branching pattern of a phylogenetic tree

Music

Topology (musical ensemble), an Australian post-classical quintet
 Topology (album), 1981 album by Joe McPhee

Other

Topology (journal), a mathematical journal, with an emphasis on subject areas related to topology and geometry
Spatial effects that cannot be described by topography, i.e., social, economical, spatial, or phenomenological interactions